Theresa Sokyrka (born 1 April 1981) is a Canadian singer-songwriter. On the second season of Canadian Idol, she was the final runner-up to winner Kalan Porter.

Biography
Born in Moose Jaw, Saskatchewan, Sokyrka studied music at Red Deer College in Red Deer, Alberta. She is drawn to the blues and jazz more than other musical genres, and sings with passion and vulnerability. She loves to scat, adding flare and style to her songs. During an Idol taping, Lionel Richie said there was "the soul of an old black woman living inside her". She comes from a very musical family, and she plays the violin, guitar, and piano.

She was Saskatchewan Centennial 2005 Youth Ambassador.  "... dozens of classrooms submitted their centennial stories, photographs and celebrations ... for an opportunity to have Theresa Sokyrka visit their classroom and perform for the entire school.
...
'Theresa has been an inspiration to many young people in our province and we're absolutely thrilled that our students have an opportunity to share their centennial message with the youth ambassador' "

Sokyrka currently lives in Saskatoon, Saskatchewan. Her latest album, released in 2013, is "Prairie Winds" which she recorded, mixed and mastered in Madrid, Spain in two weeks.

Canadian Idol
On the second season of Canadian Idol, Sokyrka was known for scatting during her songs, the grace she showed during the judges' critiques, and her friendly personality. Zack Werner once said she was his favourite singer on the show from the first two seasons. A memorable comment made about Sokyrka came from judge Jake Gold; he said "Your future is so bright, I've got to wear shades" as he put on his sunglasses. Kalan Porter said it was great ending the show with Theresa, and that she had something really special to offer. The duet they performed during the finale, "True Colors", was arguably one of the most touching moments in Canadian Idol history.

Songs that Theresa performed during the season included:

Her standout songs on the show were "Summertime", "Good Mother", "Song For A Winter's Night", "Cruisin", "Ready for Love", and "Come Away with Me".

Discography

EPS

 Four Hours in November EP (2004)

Studio albums

In addition to the above mentioned, Sokyrka was featured on Kalan Porter's album "219 Days" (2004). Also "Baby, It's Cold Outside" a single with Matt Dusk in 2007

Radio Singles
 "Turned My Back" (2005)
 "Waiting Song" (2006)
 "Sandy Eyes" (2007)
 "Baby, It's Cold Outside" (2007)
 "Everything" (2010)

References

External links
 Official website
 Theresa Sokyrka Online – Lyrics

1981 births
Living people
Canadian women singer-songwriters
Canadian Idol participants
Musicians from Saskatchewan
People from Moose Jaw
Canadian people of Ukrainian descent
Canadian women pop singers
21st-century Canadian women singers
Ukrainian-language singers